Romeo Jenebyan (born 10 September 1979) is a former Armenian football player. He has played for Armenia national team.

National team statistics

References

1979 births
Living people
Armenian footballers
Armenia international footballers
FC Urartu players
FC Mika players
FC Impuls Dilijan players
Armenian Premier League players
Association football midfielders